The Nonnette is a French pastry, translating literally to "little nuns". It is a small gingerbread cake made of honey, rye flour, and usually filled with orange marmalade or honey. It is also typically glazed with a mixtures of egg whites, sugar, and lemon juice, and is frequently served during Christmastime.

Nonnettes tend to have a sticky, moist texture due to their glaze and a spicy taste due to a combination of cardamom, ginger, cinnamon, nutmeg, and allspice.

History 
Nonnettes were originally prepared in Dijon, France. Early records show that they were first created by nuns in the abbey during the Middle Ages, thus leading to their namesake. They were popularized by Mulot & Petitjean, a baking company established in Dijon in 1796, who began packaging and selling nonnettes to the general public.

Gallery

See also
 List of pastries
 List of French desserts
 List of French dishes

References

French cakes
Honey dishes